The Sutunga is a river in the Cooch Behar district, West Bengal, India. It passes the town of Mathabhanga before it flows into the Jaldhaka River.

References

Rivers of West Bengal
Rivers of India